In mathematics, the Carathéodory kernel theorem is a result in complex analysis and geometric function theory established by the Greek mathematician Constantin Carathéodory in 1912. The uniform convergence on compact sets of a sequence of holomorphic univalent functions, defined on the unit disk in the complex plane and fixing 0, can be formulated purely geometrically in terms of the limiting behaviour of the images of the functions. The kernel theorem has wide application in the theory of univalent functions and in particular provides the geometric basis for the Loewner differential equation.

Kernel of a sequence of open sets
Let Un be a sequence of open sets in C containing 0. Let Vn be the connected component of the interior of  containing 0. The kernel of the sequence is defined to be the union of the Vn's, provided it is non-empty; otherwise it is defined to be . Thus the kernel is either a connected open set containing 0 or the one point set . The sequence is said to converge to a kernel if each subsequence has the same kernel.

Examples

If Un is an increasing sequence of connected open sets containing 0, then the kernel is just the union.
If Un is a decreasing sequence of connected open sets containing 0, then, if 0 is an interior point of U1 ∩ U2 ∩ ..., the sequence converges to the component of the interior containing 0.

Kernel theorem
Let fn(z) be a sequence of holomorphic univalent functions on the unit disk D, normalised so that fn(0) = 0 and f 'n (0) > 0. Otherwise the kernel is a connected open set U, f is univalent on D and f(D) = U.

Proof
Using Hurwitz's theorem and Montel's theorem, it is straightforward to check that if fn tends uniformly on compacta to f then each subsequence of Un has kernel U = f(D).

Conversely if Un converges to a kernel not equal to C, then by the Koebe quarter theorem Un contains the disk of radius f 'n(0) / 4 with centre 0. The assumption that U ≠ C implies that these radii are uniformly bounded. By the Koebe distortion theorem

Hence the sequence fn is uniformly bounded on compact sets. If two subsequences converge to holomorphic limits f and g, then f(0) = g(0) and with f'(0), g'''(0) ≥ 0. By the first part and the assumptions it follows that f(D) = g(D). Uniqueness in the Riemann mapping theorem forces f = g, so the original sequence f''n is uniformly convergent on compact sets.

References

Theorems in complex analysis